Aubel–Thimister–Stavelot is a junior (ages 17–18) multi-day cycling race held annually in Belgium. It was part of the UCI Junior World Cup from 2003 to 2007. From 1955 to 2013, the race was named Liège-La Gleize, before being changed to Aubel–Thimister–La Gleize in 2014 and then to Aubel–Thimister–Stavelot in 2018.

Winners

References

External links

Cycle races in Belgium
Recurring sporting events established in 1955
1955 establishments in Belgium